Capeochloa is a genus of South African plants in the grass family.

 Species
 Capeochloa arundinacea (P.J.Bergius) N.P.Barker & H.P.Linder
 Capeochloa cincta (Nees) N.P.Barker & H.P.Linder
 Capeochloa setacea (N.P.Barker) N.P.Barker & H.P.Linder

See also
 List of Poaceae genera

References

Danthonioideae
Endemic flora of South Africa
Grasses of South Africa
Poaceae genera